Transmembrane protein 130 is a protein that in humans is encoded by the TMEM130 gene.

References

Further reading